Mistawasis 103 is an Indian reserve of the Mistawasis Nêhiyawak in Saskatchewan. It is 68 kilometres west of Prince Albert. In the 2016 Canadian Census, it recorded a population of 681 living in 175 of its 180 total private dwellings. In the same year, its Community Well-Being index was calculated at 42 of 100, compared to 58.4 for the average First Nations community and 77.5 for the average non-Indigenous community.

References

Indian reserves in Saskatchewan
Division No. 16, Saskatchewan